Sphaceloma randii is a fungus which is a plant pathogen infecting pecan.

References

External links
 USDA ARS Fungal Database

Fungal tree pathogens and diseases
Nut tree diseases
Myriangiales
Fungi described in 1965